Daniel Woger (born February 25, 1988) is an Austrian professional ice hockey forward currently playing for the Graz99ers of the ICE Hockey League (ICEHL). He participated with the Austrian national team at the 2015 IIHF World Championship.

On 28 August 2020, Woger returned to his original youth club and team where he made his professional debut in the Dornbirn Bulldogs, agreeing to a one-year contract.

References

External links

1988 births
Living people
Austrian ice hockey forwards
EHC Black Wings Linz players
People from Bregenz
Dornbirn Bulldogs players
Graz 99ers players
HC Thurgau players
HC TWK Innsbruck players
Vienna Capitals players
Sportspeople from Vorarlberg